Potiphar is a figure in the Hebrew Bible and the Quran. His name possibly indicates the same figure as Potiphera.

Potiphar is the captain of Pharaoh's guard who is said to have purchased Joseph as a slave and, impressed by his intelligence, makes him the master of his household. Potiphar's wife, who was known for her infidelities, took a liking to Joseph, and attempted to seduce him. When Joseph refused her advances, and ran off, leaving his outer vestment in her hands, she retaliated by falsely accusing him of trying to rape her, and Potiphar had Joseph imprisoned.

What happened to Potiphar after that is unclear; some sources identify him as Potipherah, an Egyptian priest whose daughter, Asenath, marries Joseph. The false accusation by Potiphar's wife plays an important role in Joseph's narrative, because had he not been imprisoned, he would not have met the fellow prisoner who introduced him to Pharaoh.

The medieval Sefer HaYashar, a commentary on the Torah, gives Potiphar's wife's name as Zuleikha, as do many Islamic traditions - thus the Persian poem called Yusuf and Zulaikha from Jami's Haft Awrang "Seven thrones".

The story became a very common subject in Western art during the Renaissance and Baroque periods, usually depicting the moment when Joseph tears himself away from the bed containing a more-or-less naked figure of Potiphar's wife. Persian miniatures often illustrate Yusuf and Zulaikha in Jami's Haft Awrang ("Seven thrones").

Religious references
It is difficult to tie Potiphar or Joseph accurately to a particular pharaoh or time period. According to the Jewish calendar, Joseph was purchased in the year 2216, which is 1544 BC, at the end of the Second Intermediate Period or very beginning of the New Kingdom. The Torah in which the story appears (see also the Bible and the Quran), was the earliest written of the three: c. 600 BC during the Babylonian Exile. According to the documentary hypothesis, the story of Potiphar and his wife is credited to the Yahwist source, and stands in the same place that the stories of the butler and the baker and Pharaoh's dreams stand in the Elohist text.

Islam
The story is first related in Quran 12:21-35: An Egyptian purchases Joseph and proposes to adopt him. The Egyptian's wife endeavours to seduce Joseph but he was preserved from her enticements. She accuses Joseph of an attempt to dishonour her. The rent in his garment testifies Joseph's innocence. Azeez believes Joseph and condemns his wife. The sin of Azeez's wife becomes known in the city (Q12:30). The wives of other noblemen, seeing Joseph's beauty, call him an angel. Azeez's wife declares her purpose to imprison Joseph unless he yield to her solicitations. Joseph seeks protection from God who hears his prayer and turns aside their snares but Joseph is imprisoned notwithstanding his innocence.

Cultural references

In art the subject is one of the most commonly shown in the Power of Women topos. 
 There is a Persian poem called Yusuf and Zulaikha in Jami's Haft Awrang ("Seven thrones")
In The Divine Comedy, Dante sees the shade of Potiphar's wife in the eighth circle of Hell. She does not speak, but Dante is told by another spirit that, along with other perjurers, she is condemned to suffer a burning fever for all eternity.
In the John Sayles film Matewan, Will Oldham plays a young minister boy who preaches the story of Potiphar to his small town.
In Andrew Lloyd Webber and Tim Rice's musical Joseph and the Amazing Technicolor Dreamcoat, Potiphar is a tycoon of ancient Egypt who made his wealth through buying shares in pyramids, ("Potiphar had made a huge pile, owned a large percentage of the Nile"). His wife is a seductive man-eater. Both feature in the song "Potiphar".
In John Keats' poem, "On Fame", Keats calls Fame "Sister-in-law to jealous Potiphar".
In the animated film Joseph: King of Dreams, prior to having him jailed for allegedly assaulting his wife, Potiphar takes notice of Joseph's intelligence and makes him a chief slave in his household. He orders Joseph to be executed for the attempted rape of his wife, but when she asks him to stop, Potiphar realizes Joseph was telling the truth of his innocence and instead has him jailed to save face, though he shows great disgust at his wife. Potiphar later brings Joseph to Pharaoh, who is plagued by inexplicable dreams, and expresses deep regret for having Joseph put in prison, but Joseph understands and forgives Potiphar. After Joseph interprets Pharaoh's dreams, Pharaoh asks Potiphar if he trusts Joseph, to which he responds that he trusts Joseph "with [his] life." Potiphar also is present when Joseph reunites with his brothers.
In Joseph and his Brothers, Thomas Mann suggests that Potiphar's wife is sexually frustrated partly because Potiphar is a eunuch.
 In Margaret Atwood's The Testaments, the sequel to The Handmaid's Tale, Potiphor's wife is referred to in Chapter 46 of the Ardua Hall Holograph storyline as narrated by Aunt Lydia. She mentions that Dr. Grove defended himself against attempted rape charges through the Potiphar vignette.
 Czechoslovak author Valdemar Vinař wrote La skandalo pro Jozefo, an original work of fiction in Esperanto, relating the story from the viewpoints of five different witnesses.

Gallery

See also
 Yusuf and Zulaikha

References

Bibliography
 Osman, A. (1987) The Hebrew Pharaohs of Egypt, Bear & Co.: Rochester, Vermont. .

Ancient Egyptians
Joseph (Genesis)
Book of Genesis people
Egypt in the Hebrew Bible
False allegations of sex crimes
People of the Quran
Egyptian slave owners